Joris Moutachy (born 4 November 1997) is a French professional footballer who plays as a right-back for Ligue 2 club Chamois Niortais.

Professional career
On 20 May 2020, Moutachy signed his first professional contract with Chamois Niortais. He made his professional debut with Niort in a 1-1 Ligue 2 tie with FC Chambly on 28 August 2020.

References

External links
 
 FDB Profile
 Joris Moutachy official instagram link 

Living people
1997 births
French footballers
Footballers from Orléans
French people of Martiniquais descent
Association football fullbacks
ES Troyes AC players
Athlético Marseille players
US Orléans players
SO Romorantin players
Chamois Niortais F.C. players
Ligue 2 players
Championnat National players
Championnat National 2 players
Championnat National 3 players